The William Miles Tiernan House, also known as the Tiernan-Riley House, is a historic home located at Wheeling, Ohio County, West Virginia. It was built in 1900–01, and is a -story, L-shaped, Georgian Revival-style brick dwelling.  It features two-story Ionic order pilasters that flank the one-story entrance portico.  The house was built for William M. Tiernan, who was vice-president of the Bloch Brothers Tobacco Company.

It was listed on the National Register of Historic Places in 1993.  It is located in the Woodsdale-Edgewood Neighborhood Historic District.

Gallery

See also
List of historic sites in Ohio County, West Virginia
List of Registered Historic Places in West Virginia

References

Georgian Revival architecture in West Virginia
Houses completed in 1901
Houses in Wheeling, West Virginia
Houses on the National Register of Historic Places in West Virginia
Individually listed contributing properties to historic districts on the National Register in West Virginia
Landmarks in West Virginia
National Register of Historic Places in Wheeling, West Virginia